Tjurbo may refer to:

Yttertjurbo Hundred, Sweden
Övertjurbo Hundred, Sweden